The women's artistic individual all-around gymnastic event at the 2015 Pan American Games was held on July 13 at the Toronto Coliseum.

Schedule
All times are Eastern Standard Time (UTC-3).

Results

Final

Qualification
Megan Skaggs of the United States and Lorrane Oliveira of Brazil finished in 5th and 12th respectively, but did they not progress to the final due to the fact that only two athletes per country can qualify for finals.

Qualification Legend: Q = Qualified to apparatus final; R = Qualified to apparatus final as reserve

References

Gymnastics at the 2015 Pan American Games
2015 in women's gymnastics